The 2012 season marked the 105th season in which the Richmond Football Club participated in the AFL/VFL.

2011 off-season list changes

Retirements and delistings

Trades

Note: All traded picks are indicative and do not reflect final selection position

National draft

Preseason draft

Rookie draft

2012 squad

2012 season

Pre-season 

Note: Round 4 matches were conducted under normal AFL Premiership season rules and did not count towards the NAB Cup Ladder.

Home and away season

Source: AFL Tables

Ladder

Awards

League awards

Brownlow Medal - Trent Cotchin

All-Australian team

Rising Star
Nominations:

22 Under 22 team

Brownlow Medal tally

*Note: Trent Cotchin initially finished second just was awarded the Medal in 2016 when Jobe Watson relinquished his claim

Club awards

Jack Dyer Medal

Michael Roach Medal

References

External links
Richmond Tigers Official AFL Site
Official Site of the Australian Football League

Richmond Football Club seasons
Richmond Tigers